Y'Mera Xebella Challa, also known simply as Mera, is a fictional character in the DC Extended Universe. She is based on the character of the same name commonly associated with Aquaman, and is portrayed by Amber Heard. Making her debut in the theatrical release of Justice League, Mera is a princess from the underwater kingdom of Xebel and demonstrates aquatic superpowers. She serves as Arthur Curry / Aquaman's main love interest and a foil to his character, much like the comics. The first portrayal of Mera in live-action cinema, Heard's performance has mostly received mixed reviews from critics and fans alike.

Character development

Comics origin
Mera, the traditional love interest of Aquaman, first appeared in comics in 1963 and is typically portrayed as the queen of the seas alongside Aquaman as king. Aquaman and Mera were notably married in the first superhero wedding in comic book history, in Aquaman #18 (Dec 1964). Later comics writers have given more emphasis on Mera's own aquatic superpowers and abilities as a warrior in her own right, with certain storylines adding her to the ranks of the Justice League alongside Aquaman or in his place.

Casting, execution, and special effects
After years of attempting to adapt Aquaman to film, American actress Amber Heard was first cast as Mera for the DC Extended Universe films Justice League and Aquaman in 2016, after Jason Momoa had been cast as Arthur Curry / Aquaman. This marked Heard's first major role in a studio film. She has stated that one of the reasons attracting her to the part was Mera being "a strong, independent, self-possessed superhero in her own right".

For the films, Heard wore a red wig over her natural hair, with the hue of red in Aquaman being much more vibrant than in either version of Justice League due to different color saturations used by the films. Fans noted that the deeper red in Aquaman was more faithful to the comics, though film colorist Mark Griffith admitted that Mera's hair color was "too vibrant" during certain scenes in the film. Thus, he worked to desaturate the color in those scenes. Several special effects studios, such as Industrial Light & Magic (ILM), Method Studios, Scanline VFX, Digital Domain and others were employed to render Mera's underwater and fighting scenes and hair movement in water, with the effects visible in scenes such as Orm and Arthur's first duel, Arthur and Mera's fight against Black Manta, and Arthur and Mera's visit to the Trench. In addition, Heard and other actors and stunt doubles were attached to harnesses during filming to simulate fighting under-water.

In Zack Snyder's Justice League, the director's cut of the 2017 theatrical release of Justice League, Mera noticeably speaks with a British accent whereas in the theatrical cut and Aquaman, Heard utilizes her usual American accent in her portrayal of the character. Heard was one of several actors who returned for additional filming for the "Snyder Cut" in 2020, along with Ben Affleck, Ray Fisher, Joe Manganiello, Ezra Miller, and Jared Leto.

During the production of Aquaman and the Lost Kingdom, it was reported by Puck News that DC Films president Walter Hamada was present for a "three-hour deposition" to testify on the subject of Heard's presence in the sequel film. While Heard was ultimately brought back for the March 2023 release, her option was initially declined. As heard in Hamada's testimony, the initial decline was due to chemistry concerns with Momoa. Issues between Momoa and Heard have been publicly referenced in the past.

Film appearances

Justice League

Theatrical cut

Mera makes her cinematic debut in the theatrical cut of Justice League. She is seen guarding a Mother Box under watch by the Atlanteans when Steppenwolf arrives to steal it. Despite Arthur Curry also arriving to help, Mera and the other Atlanteans are handily defeated by the New God, losing the box to him. Mera convinces Arthur to go after Steppenwolf and help the Justice League, giving Arthur his armor and trident.

Director's cut

During her battle with Steppenwolf, Mera demonstrates the ability to manipulate blood, nearly bleeding him to death before he counterattacks. Steppenwolf nearly kills her until Arthur's intervention, as the latter blocks the killing blow. Mera mentions that her parents were killed in the Xebel wars, forcing Arthur's mother Atlanna to raise her. Following the Justice League's defeat of Steppenwolf, Mera and Nuidis Vulko meet up with Arthur as he bids them goodbye on his way to visit his father Thomas.

Mera is present in Bruce Wayne's second "Knightmare" vision in which she, Batman, Flash, Cyborg, Deathstroke, and Joker are on the run and being hunted by Superman, who had been brainwashed by Darkseid into becoming his second-in-command after Darkseid takes over the world in that reality. Mera has joined Batman's insurgency to avenge Arthur after he is slain by Darkseid, taking up his trident. She bickers with Batman, arguing he does not know the feeling of loss until Joker brings up the deaths of his parents and his adopted son.

Aquaman

After Arthur's half brother Orm Marius, to whom Mera is betrothed, threatens to wage war against the surface world as King of Atlantis and coerces the underwater kingdoms to join him, Mera follows up with Arthur at the surface and beseeches him to stop Orm. Arthur refuses at first, but Mera gains his trust after she saves Thomas from a tsunami summoned by Orm. She finally introduces herself by name to Arthur and ventures with him to reunite with Vulko. Meanwhile, Mera's father, Nereus, is shown to be alive. He is tricked into joining King Orm's alliance.

Mera and Arthur meet up with Vulko in Atlantis, though they are ambushed by Orm's men and Arthur is captured. Mera is forced to watch from the stands as Orm challenges Arthur to a duel to the death, but she decides to abandon Orm and rescue Arthur during the fight. She and Arthur narrowly escape before following clues to the long-lost Trident of Atlan, which takes them on a journey through the Sahara and eventually to Sicily. Though the two constantly bicker at first, they wind up falling in love. They are eventually attacked by David Kane, a human mercenary hired by Orm to eliminate them. Realizing that they were found through a bracelet disguised as a tracking device given to her by Orm, Mera destroys the tracking device and helps Arthur fend off Kane and several Atlantean guards, though Arthur is wounded in the melee.

After escaping, Mera and Arthur are attacked by creatures native to the Trench and are forced to retreat into a vortex, which takes them to the center of the Earth. There, the two find Atlanna, who was thought to have been executed for Arthur's illegitimate birth, alive and well, in addition to finding the trident guarded by the Karathen. Arthur is able to retrieve the Trident, being the true king of Atlantis, gaining control of the Seven Seas. He, Mera, and the Karathen proceed to lead an army of sea creatures into battle as Orm aims to conquer the Kingdom of the Brine. Mera convinces Nereus to join Arthur, which he does after seeing Arthur with the Trident. After Arthur defeats Orm, Mera is at his side when he officially takes the throne of Atlantis.

Aquaman and the Lost Kingdom

Heard is currently slated to reprise her role of Mera in Aquaman and the Lost Kingdom.

Other appearances

Aquaman: King of Atlantis 

Though the HBO Max animated mini-series Aquaman: King of Atlantis is non-canon to the main DCEU, it references several events from the films and takes place shortly after Arthur becomes king in Aquaman. Mera is voiced by Gillian Jacobs in the series.

Reception

Heard's performance as Mera in Aquaman received mostly mixed or ambivalent reviews. Helen O'Hara of Empire described Mera in the film as a "Little Mermaid cosplayer" and Arthur Curry's main source of exposition, of which he relies entirely on. Michael O'Sullivan of The Washington Post wrote that Heard felt like "a fish out of water" next to the "charismatic" Jason Momoa, though he praised the "silly, meet-cute romcom" dynamic between Arthur and Mera. As for Mera's design in the film, Matt Zoller Seitz of RogerEbert.com praised the intricate jellyfish gown that she wore at Arthur and Orm's first duel, while Veronica Walsingham of Slate criticized the shade of red in Mera's hair, stating that it looked unnatural and less convincing than in Justice League. Following the release of Zack Snyder's Justice League, fans praised the expanded portrayal of Mera's abilities and an improved connection to her arc in Aquaman than the theatrical cut of Justice League, though they also noticed several inconsistencies with her character between the "Snyder Cut" and Aquaman, including her accent and the fate of her father, Nereus.

Casting controversy
In light of Heard's highly-publicized divorce from ex-husband Johnny Depp, in addition to the subsequent legal battle and allegations of abuse towards Depp and his dismissal from Fantastic Beasts: The Secrets of Dumbledore due to allegations of his own abuse towards Heard that were published by The Sun, fans began to push for Heard to also be fired. In November 2020, a Change.org petition to have Heard fired from the franchise received more than 1.5 million signatures, and some even wanted Heard edited out of Zack Snyder's Justice League. As of May 2022, the Change.org petition has since surpassed four million signatures, many of which came during the public trial of Depp's defamation lawsuit against Heard. Certain fans petitioned for Emilia Clarke, who had played Daenerys Targaryen opposite Jason Momoa's Khal Drogo in Game of Thrones, to replace Heard in the role of Mera. 

However, Aquaman and the Lost Kingdom producer Peter Safran said Heard's return was right for the film and they never considered making the sequel without her. He added that they would not react to the "pure fan pressure" of the petition and other social media conversations which received negative backlash considering Depp’s own firing.

See also
Characters of the DC Extended Universe

References

 The plot description and characterization were adapted from Mera at the DC Extended Universe Wiki, which is available under a Creative Commons Attribution-Share Alike 3.0 (Unported) (CC-BY-SA 3.0) license.

External links

Action film characters
Aquaman (film series)
Characters created by Zack Snyder
DC Comics Atlanteans 
DC Extended Universe characters
DC Comics characters who can move at superhuman speeds
DC Comics characters who use magic
DC Comics characters with accelerated healing
DC Comics characters with superhuman strength
DC Comics female superheroes
DC Comics metahumans
Female characters in film
Fictional characters with water abilities
Fictional mermen and mermaids
Fictional princesses
Fictional women soldiers and warriors
Film characters introduced in 2017
Casting controversies in film